Tulashboy Doniyorov (born March 30, 1981) is a boxer from Uzbekistan, who participated in the 2004 Summer Olympics for his native Asian country.

Career
2002 at the Asian Games he was eliminated in the first round by Filipino Violito Payla.

2004 at the Olympics he defeated Violito Payla and Ronald Siler but was defeated in the quarterfinals of the Flyweight (51 kg) division by France's Jérôme Thomas. Doniyorov qualified for the Athens Games by ending up in first place at the 1st AIBA Asian 2004 Olympic Qualifying Tournament in Guangzhou, China. In the final he defeated India's Akhil Kumar.

At the 2007 World Amateur Boxing Championships he lost in the first round to eventual winner Raushee Warren.

External links
 

1981 births
Living people
Uzbekistani male boxers
Olympic boxers of Uzbekistan
Boxers at the 2004 Summer Olympics
Boxers at the 2008 Summer Olympics
Boxers at the 2002 Asian Games
Asian Games competitors for Uzbekistan
Flyweight boxers
21st-century Uzbekistani people